Daingerfield is a surname. Notable people with the surname include:

Elliott Daingerfield (1859–1932), American artist
John E.P. Daingerfield, American Confederate officer
Michael Daingerfield (born 1970), Canadian actor
William H. Daingerfield (1808–1878), American politician and Texan envoy to Europe